Lloyd MacGregor Trefethen (March 15, 1919 – November 6, 2001) was an American expert in fluid dynamics known for his invention of the heat pipe and his research on the Coriolis effect and card shuffling. He worked for many years as a professor of mechanical engineering at Tufts University.

Early life and education
Trefethen was born on March 15, 1919, in Waltham, Massachusetts. He graduated from the Webb Institute in 1940, and went to the Massachusetts Institute of Technology for a master's degree in naval engineering.

During World War II, poor eyesight made Trefethen ineligible for the Navy, so instead he signed up for the United States Merchant Marine. There he met Florence Newman, a Navy codebreaker who later became a professor of English at Tufts. They married in 1944. Their son Lloyd N. Trefethen later became a notable mathematician; they also had an older daughter, quilter Gwyned Trefethen.

In 1950, Trefethen completed a Ph.D. at the University of Cambridge. Although his initial plan of research was on cooling turbine blades, his eventual dissertation was Heat Transfer Properties of Liquid Metals, and his work sparked an ongoing interest in magnetohydrodynamics at Cambridge.

Career and later life
On returning to the US, Trefethen took a managerial position at the National Science Foundation before joining Harvard University as an assistant professor of engineering in 1954. He moved to Tufts University in 1958, where he became a full professor and the chair of the mechanical engineering department. He retired in 1989.

Trefethen died on November 6, 2001.

Contributions
Trefethen was known for his research on surface tension in liquid droplets, and he became one of the independent inventors of the heat pipe. In 1963 he produced an award-winning educational film, Surface Tension in Fluid Mechanics, for Encyclopædia Britannica Films.
Trefethen's contributions to fluid mechanics also included widely reported experiments on the folklore claims that the Coriolis force can cause the vortex in a drain to rotate in opposite directions in the northern and southern hemispheres.

Beyond fluid dynamics, Trefethen's publications include a paper with his son Lloyd N. Trefethen on the Gilbert–Shannon–Reeds model, a mathematical model of shuffling playing cards. In contrast to earlier research suggesting that seven riffles are needed to remove any patterns from an unshuffled deck of cards, Trefethen and Trefethen showed that, in their model of the problem, five riffles are enough.

Recognition 
Trefethen was a Fellow of the ASME. In 1999, a special issue of the Journal of Fluids Engineering was dedicated to Trefethen to honor his 80th birthday.

Selected publications

References

1919 births
2001 deaths
People from Waltham, Massachusetts
American mechanical engineers
Webb Institute alumni
MIT School of Engineering alumni
Alumni of the University of Cambridge
Harvard University faculty
Tufts University faculty
Fellows of the American Society of Mechanical Engineers
Lloyd
United States Merchant Mariners of World War II